Rachel Jevon (1627 – ?) was an English poet of the mid-17th century. She is known for her poem Exultationis carmen, published in Latin and English versions in 1660.

Jevon was probably born in Broom, Worcester, where she was baptised on 23 January 1627. Her father, Daniell Jevon (died 1654), was the rector of Broom, and Rachel's mother was called Elizabeth. According to a petition presented to the king in 1662, Rachel's father was a Royalist supporter who had been imprisoned for his loyalty. Very little else is known about her life.

The poem was written to celebrate the Restoration of King Charles II of England and, according to the subtitle, was "presented with her own hand" on 16 August of that year. It was printed by John Macock. Early in Charles's reign, Rachel presented two petitions seeking employment as a servant in the royal household.

References

1627 births
17th-century English poets
Date of death unknown
English women poets
17th-century Latin-language writers
New Latin-language poets